Lisa Duffy may refer to:

 Lisa Duffy (politician), British politician
 Lisa Duffy (Home and Away), a recurring character in the Australian soap opera Home and Away

See also
 Lisa Duffin, fictional character from British TV series Casualty played by Cathy Shipton, and nicknamed Duffy